The Herefordshire Football Association, simply known as the Herefordshire FA or HFA, is the governing body of football in the county of Herefordshire. It runs several league and cup competitions in the county.

Administration
The Herefordshire FA consists of two key bodies.

The Council, comprising 17 elected representatives from the Leagues within the county plus 11 Life Members. The Council meets 4 times per year to consider policy issues and direction, as well as to approve proposals put forward by the various committees.

The Board was established in 1998 to make the decision-making process more streamlined, is responsible for major business, strategic and commercial decisions. The Board comprises six elected representatives from the Council, plus the HFA Chief Executive and Company Secretary.

The Herefordshire FA are committed to developing and administering the game at all levels within the county. In line with The Football Association's Whole Sport Plan, the County FA has produced a four-year plan aimed at providing everyone with the opportunity to participate in football for life.

They are keen to develop partnerships to promote the benefits of football and improve the facilities where football is played. Working with key partners we hope to access essential funding which can be invested to increase the quantity and quality of pitches and facilities providing more and better playing opportunities.

Affiliated leagues and competitions

Men's Saturday Leagues
Herefordshire FA County League

Men's Sunday Leagues
Herefordshire Sunday League

Youth Leagues
Herefordshire Junior League
Herefordshire Girls League
HFA Floodlit Youth League

Small Sided Leagues
HFA Indoor League

Cup Competitions
HFA County Challenge 
HFA Senior Cup
HFA Charity Bowl 
HFA Junior Cup 
HFA Burghill Cup
HFA Giantkillers 
HFA Sunday Cup
HFA Women's Cup
HFA Youth Cup 
Tesco Cup Boys
Tesco Cup Girls U14
Tesco Cup Girls U16

Affiliated Member Clubs
All the clubs (Excluding Reserves) that are affiliated to the Herefordshire FA are:

Bartestree
Belmont Rangers 
Burghill Rangers
Civil Service 
Clee Hill United
Credenhill 
Dore Valley 
Ewyas Harold
Fownhope
Hartpury University
Hereford Lads Club Colts
Hinton
Holme Lacy 
Ledbury Town
Ledbury Town Swifts 
Leominster Town F.C.
Ludlow Town Colts F.C.
Orleton 
Hereford Pegasus FC
Ross Juniors
Shobdon 
Tenbury Town 
Tenbury United
Tenbury United Colts. 
Welland
Wellington Colts
Wellington Rangers 
Westfields
Woofferton 
Worcester United F.C.

List of recent County Cup Winners

Source

References

External links
 Herefordshire FA Official Website

County football associations
Football in Herefordshire